

O

References

Lists of words